Pandanus verecundus is a species of plant in the family Pandanaceae. It is endemic to New Caledonia.

References

Endemic flora of New Caledonia
verecundus
Taxonomy articles created by Polbot

Endangered flora of Oceania